The following is a list of all team-to-team transactions that have occurred in the National Hockey League during the lockout shortened 2012–13 NHL season. It lists what team each player has been officially released by, traded to, signed by, or claimed by, and for which player(s) or draft pick(s), if applicable. Players who have retired are also listed. The 2012–13 trade deadline was set for April 3, 2013, at 3 pm EST. Players involved in any trades after this deadline are ineligible to participate in the Stanley Cup playoffs.

Retirement

Contract terminations
At any time, a team and a player can mutually agree to terminate a player's contract.

For more details on contract terminations:

Teams may buy out player contracts (after the conclusion of a season) for a portion of the remaining value of the contract, paid over a period of twice the remaining length of the contract. This reduced number and extended period is applied to the cap hit as well.
If the player was under the age of 26 at the time of the buyout the player's pay and cap hit will reduced by a factor of 2/3 over the extended period. 
If the player was 26 or older at the time of the buyout the player's pay and cap hit will reduced by a factor of 1/3 over the extended period. 
If the player was 35 or older at the time of signing the contract the player's pay will be reduced by a factor of 1/3, but the cap hit will not be reduced over the extended period.

All players must clear waivers before having a contract terminated. Injured players cannot be bought out.

† - Following the 2012–13 NHL lockout each team was granted two compliance buyouts (to be exercised after the 2012–13 season and/or after the 2013–14 season that would not count against the salary cap in any further year, regardless of the player's age. After using an compliance buyout on a player, that player is prohibited from rejoining the team that bought him out for one year; the NHL deemed that the re-signing of a player following a trade and a subsequent compliance buyout would be ruled as cap circumvention.

‡ - Following the 2012–13 NHL lockout each team was granted one accelerated compliance buyout on a player with a salary cap hit of $3 million U.S. or more before the regular season began. If an accelerated compliance buyout is used, that team will only have one more compliance buyout left, and they must use it after the completion of the 2012–13 season (and before the start of 2013–14 season). The player's cap hit is applied in full to the team's salary cap for the 2012–13 season, but for no season after, regardless of contract length.

Free agency

Offer sheets
An offer sheet is a contract offered to a restricted free agent by a team other than the one for which he played during the prior season. If the player signs the offer sheet, his current team has seven days to match the contract offer and keep the player or else he goes to the team that gave the offer sheet, with compensation going to his first team.

Trades
* - Following the 2012–13 NHL lockout each team was granted to have up to three contracts on their payroll where they have retained salary in a trade (i.e. the player no longer plays with Team A due to a trade to Team B, but Team A still retains some salary). Only up to 50% of a player's contract can be kept, and only up to 15% of a team's salary cap can be taken up by retained salary. A contract can only be involved in one of these trades twice.

June

July

August to December
No trades due to the 2012–13 NHL lockout.

January

February

March

April

June (2013)

For details concerning conditional draft picks see the appropriate Entry Draft pages.

Waivers
Once an NHL player has played in a certain number of games or a set number of seasons has passed since the signing of his first NHL contract (see here), that player must be offered to all of the other NHL teams before he can be assigned to a minor league affiliate.

See also
2012–13 NHL season
2012 NHL Entry Draft
2013 NHL Entry Draft
2014 NHL Entry Draft
2012–13 NHL suspensions and fines
2012 in sports
2013 in sports
2011–12 NHL transactions
2013–14 NHL transactions

References

TSN transactions
Official NHL Free Agent signings
The Hockey News transactions

Transactions
2012-13